Andrii Chekotun (born 2 September 2002) is a professional Ukrainian football goalkeeper.

Career
Chekotun was born in Vinnytsia, and began to play football in his native town, where he joined local youth sportive school. After that, he joined Shakhtar Donetsk academy in the age 13, where his first trainer was Volodymyr Savchenko. After he continued his football formation in RVUFK Kyiv and in the FC Olimpik Donetsk youth sportive school systems. 

In September 2018 he was transferred to the Ukrainian Premier League side FC Olimpik and played for it in the Ukrainian Premier League Reserves and Under 19 Championship during one season. In December 2019 he was promoted to the main squad to play in the Ukrainian Premier League. Chekotun made his debut in the Ukrainian Premier League for FC Olimpik as a start squad player on 5 July 2020, playing in a losing home match against SC Dnipro-1.

References

External links
 
 

2002 births
Living people
Footballers from Vinnytsia
Piddubny Olympic College alumni 
Ukrainian footballers
Association football goalkeepers
FC Olimpik Donetsk players
AFC Eskilstuna players
Ukrainian Premier League players
Ukrainian expatriate footballers
Expatriate footballers in Sweden
Ukrainian expatriate sportspeople in Sweden
Ukraine under-21 international footballers